Aizarnazabal is a town located in the province of Gipuzkoa, in the autonomous community of Basque Country, in the north of Spain. As of 2014 it had a total population of 775 inhabitants.

References

External links

Official Website Information available in Spanish and Basque.
 AIZARNAZABAL in the Bernardo Estornés Lasa - Auñamendi Encyclopedia (Euskomedia Fundazioa) Information available in Spanish

Municipalities in Gipuzkoa